A pointer or pointing stick is a solid rod used to point manually, in the form of a stick, but always finished off or artificially produced.

The typical pointer is simply a long, slender, often flexible stick made in a strong material, designed to indicate places on maps, words on blackboards etc.
In addition it may be used like any ordinary stick for other purposes, e.g. for punitive caning (compare rulering).

Some are telescopic and can be carried in a pocket like a pen.

See also 
 Yad – ceremonial pointer used by Jews when reading from a Torah scroll.
 fescue – a pointer traditionally used as a pointing stick to help children learn to read.

References 

Spanking implements
Office equipment
Educational materials